Kim Min-jung (born July 30, 1982) is a South Korean actress.

Career
Kim made her acting debut in 1988, at six years old, in the MBC Best Theater episode Widow. She then starred in numerous television dramas as one of the most in-demand and praised child actresses of her generation. As she grew up, she would become one of a set of Korean child actors who successfully transitioned into adult roles. Kim's more notable TV series include Ireland, Fashion 70's, New Heart, Strike Love, and The Thorn Birds. She has also appeared in films such as Flying Boys, Forbidden Quest, and The Scam. In 2018, Kim was cast in Kim Eun-sook's romance melodrama Mr. Sunshine.

Filmography

Film

Television series

Television show

Discography

Awards and nominations

References

External links

  at Great Company 
 
 

1982 births
Living people
Actresses from Seoul
South Korean film actresses
South Korean television actresses
South Korean child actresses
20th-century South Korean actresses
21st-century South Korean actresses
Hanyang University alumni
L&Holdings artists